High Colonies is a role-playing game published by Waterford Publishing House Ltd. (Can.) in 1988.

Description
High Colonies is a science-fiction space-adventure game, a hard-science system set in 2188. The Earth has been ravaged by a nuclear/biological holocaust, and human society continued only in the orbital colonies that surround Earth and are scattered throughout the Solar System. The game includes rules for character creation (a skill-based system), robots, one alien race, genetic engineering, melee combat (between people and/or robots), and spaceship combat. There is campaign setting material describing the factions that control the various colonies, and an introductory scenario, "Hard Times at Lyric 3." The timeline which establishes the background for High Colonies runs to almost 8,000 words.

Publication history
High Colonies featured design and art by Eric Hotz, and was published by Waterford Publishing House Ltd. in 1988 as a 104-page book.

Reception
Rick Swan reviewed High Colonies in Space Gamer Vol. II No. 1. Swan commented that "As a game, High Colonies doesn't measure up to the competition. As a sourcebook, science-fiction role-players could do a lot worse."

Reviews
White Wolf #15 (April/May, 1989)
Challenge (Issue 40)
Voyages to the Worlds of SF Gaming (Issue 11 - Apr 1990)

References

Canadian role-playing games
Role-playing games introduced in 1988
Science fiction role-playing games